Parau is a village in the Balkan Province of Turkmenistan. It is adjacent to a hillock, atop which stands the Parau Bibi Mausoleum, argued to be among the most revered shrines in the country; the village itself has the Parau Ata Mausoleum. The nearest town is Gyzylarbat.

References 

Villages in Turkmenistan
Populated places in Balkan Region